Early Days is the first album by Beth Hirsch, released in 2000.

Critical reception
AllMusic wrote that Hirsch "bridges powdery lyrics and floating acoustics throughout the nine-track album, singing from an inner spirituality." The Evening Post wrote that "it's possibly a little too narrowly focused and while the self-penned arrangements are beguiling, the disc hardly progresses beyond delicate and pretty." Newsday deemed the album "standard acoustic singer-songwriter fare, a throwback to the days when Joni Mitchell sounded fresh."

Track listing
All tracks written by Beth Hirsch.
 Come A Day - (3:35)
 Gabrielle - (3:58)
 Mary The Angel - (3:58)
 Life Is Mine - (3:06)
 Somebody Dandy - (3:45)
 The More We Live - (4:03)
 No Refrain - (3:17)
 Dream On - (2:29)
 Silent Song - (4:07)

Personnel
Beth Hirsch - vocals
Paul Simm - piano
Phil Hudson - guitar
Danny Cummings - percussion
Nana Tsiboe - percussion
Laura Fairhurst - cello
Arnie Somogyl - double bass

References

2000 debut albums